Gothalo is a 1996 Nepali-language film directed by Ujwal Ghimire.The film stars Krishna Malla, Saroj Khanal, Sarmila Malla and Shree Krishna Shrestha.  The film was a hit in Nepal.

Cast 
Krishna Malla 
Saroj Khanal
 Sharmila Malla
Shree Krishna Shrestha

Soundtrack

References 

1996 films
Nepalese romantic drama films